Elachista eleochariella is a moth of the family Elachistidae found in Europe and North America.

Description
The wingspan is .The head is grey. Forewings are grey ; plical stigma black, preceded and followed by whitish marks ; a small tornal spot, and an oblique wedge-shaped mark on costa opposite whitish. Hindwings are dark grey.

The larvae feed on glaucous sedge (Carex flacca), carnation sedge (Carex panicea), black sedge (Carex nigra), common spike-rush (Eleocharis palustris) and common cottongrass (Eriophorum angustifolium). The larvae form an upper-surface mine, starting just under the tip of the leaf. They first form a corridor which runs upwards, then doubles, widening all the while, with the final part taking about half the width of the leaf. There is some confusion as to the form of the mine with a different description on the UKmoths website.

Pupation takes place outside of the mine.

Distribution
In Europe it is found from northern Europe and northern Russia to the Pyrenees and Alps, and from Ireland to Romania. It is also found in North America.

References

External links
 Lepidoptera of Sweden
 Revision of the Nearctic species of Elachista. The tetragonella group (Lepidoptera: Elachistidae) 

eleochariella
Leaf miners
Moths described in 1851
Moths of Europe
Moths of North America
Taxa named by Henry Tibbats Stainton